Ghum Hai Kisikey Pyaar Meiin sometimes abbreviated as GHKPM is an Indian Hindi-language television drama series that premiered on 5 October 2020 on Star Plus. Digitally available on Disney+ Hotstar, it stars Ayesha Singh, Neil Bhatt, Aishwarya Sharma Bhatt and Harshad Arora. Produced by Cockrow Entertainment and Shaika Films, it is a loose adaptation of Kusum Dola.

Plot

Cast

Main 
 Ayesha Singh as Dr. Sai Joshi: Alka and Kamal's daughter; Virat's former wife; Vinayak and Savi's mother (2020-present)
 Neil Bhatt as DCP Virat Chavan: Ashwini and Ninad's son; Devyani, Samrat and Mohit's cousin; Sai's former and Patralekha's current husband; Vinayak and Savi's father (2020-present)
 Aishwarya Sharma Bhatt as Patralekha "Pakhi" Mohitepatil Chavan: Vaishali and Shailesh's daughter; Virat's obsessive lover and current wife; Samrat's widow; Vinayak's surrogate and adoptive mother (2020-present)
 Harshad Arora as Dr. Satya Adhikari (2023–present)

Recurring 
 Aria Sakaria as Savi Chavan: Sai and Virat's daughter; Vinayak's sister (2022-present)
 Tanmay Rishi Shah as Vinayak "Vinu" Chavan: Sai and Virat's son; Patralekha's adoptive son; Savi's brother (2022-present)
 Kishori Shahane as Bhavani Chavan: Former matriarch of the Chavans; Nagesh's widow; Devyani's mother; Harini's grandmother (2020-present)
 Shailesh Datar as Ret. Col. Ninad Chavan: Nagesh, Mansi, Omkar and Shivani's brother; Ashwini's husband; Virat's father; Vinayak and Savi's grandfather (2020-present)
 Bharati Patil as Ashwini Chavan: Swapna's sister; Ninad's wife; Virat's mother; Vinayak and Savi's grandmother (2020-present)
 Mridul Kumar Sinha as Omkar "Omi" Chavan: Nagesh, Mansi, Ninad and Shivani's brother; Sonali's husband; Mohit's father (2020-present)
 Sheetal Maulik as Sonali Chavan: Omkaar's wife; Mohit's mother (2020-present)
 Mitali Nag as Devyani "Devi" Chavan Deshpande: Bhavani and Nagesh's daughter; Samrat, Virat and Mohit's cousin; Pulkit's wife; Harini's mother (2020-2022)
 Yash Pandit as Dr. Pulkit Deshpande: Devyani's husband; Harini's father; Madhuri's foster brother; Sai's professor (2021-present)
 Yesha Harsora as Harini Deshpande: Devyani and Pulkit's daughter; Madhuri's foster daughter; Vinayak and Savi's cousin (2022-present)
 Hirva Trivedi as Child Harini Deshpande (2021)
 Yamini Malhotra / Tanvi Thakkar as Shivani Chavan: Nagesh, Mansi, Ninad and Omkaar's sister; Amey's former girlfriend; Rajeev's wife (2020-2021)/(2021-present)
 Sachin Shroff as Rajeev: Anuradha's brother; Shivani's husband (2022)
 Adish Vaidya / Vihaan Verma as Mohit Chavan: Sonali and Omkaar's son; Devyani, Samrat and Virat's cousin; Karishma's husband (2020-2021)/(2021-present)
 Sneha Bhawsar as Karishma Chavan: Mohit's wife(2020-present)
 Yogendra Vikram Singh as Samrat "Jiva" Salunkhe: Manasi and Ashok's son; Devyani, Virat and Mohit's cousin; Patralekha's first husband (2020;2021-2022)(Dead)
 Dimple Shaw Chauhan / Roopa Divetia as Manasi Chavan Salunkhe: Nagesh, Ninad, Omkaar and Shivani's sister; Ashok's widow; Samrat's mother (2020-2021)/(2021-2022)(Dead)
 Vishavpreet Kaur as Vaishali Mohitepatil: Shailesh's wife; Patralekha's mother (2020-2022)
 Atul Mahajan as Shailesh Mohitepatil: Vaishali's husband; Patralekha's father (2020-2022)
 Jitendra Bohara as Sunny: Virat and Samrat's best friend (2020-2021)
 Suraj Sonik as Aniket More: Sai's best friend (2021)
 Anjana Nathan / Unknown as Usha: Sai and Savi's caretaker; Kamal's foster sister (2020-2022) / (2022-present)
 Nivaan Sen / Vineet Kumar Chaudhary as Sadanand Pawle: A Naxalite; Virat's best friend; Shruti's husband; Saahas' father (2021)/(2021-2022)
 Shafaq Naaz as Shruti Pawle: A Naxalite; Sada's wife; Saahas' mother (2021-2022)
 Siddharth Bodke as Jagtap Mane: A former local goon obsessed with Sai; Kamal and Samrat's murderer (2020;2022-present)
 Ganesh Yadav as Vitthal Damodar Mane: Jagtap's father, a local politician and goon at Gadchiroli (2020)
 Jitendra Trehan as DIG Sanjeev K. Salaskar of Nagpur: Virat's senior officer (2020-2022)
 Sanjay Narvekar as Inspector Kamal Joshi: Alka's widower; Sai's father; Virat's teacher and father-in-law; Usha's foster brother; Vinayak and Savi's grandfather (2020)(Dead)
 Ribbhu Mehra as D.M. Harish Vyas
 Jia Sheth as Pari: Sai's best friend
 Tejasvi Khatal as Madhuri Patil: Pulkit's foster sister; Harini's foster mother (2021)
 Bhagya Bhanushali as Balakram: Sai's best friend
 Shalini Singh as Neha: Patralekha's best friend (2020)
 Pankaj Vishnu as Inspector Pawar
 Rakesh Rajwant as Officer Gopal Shinde
 Somesh Sharma as Ajinkya Mhatre: Sai's college friend
 Riddhi Gupta as Sandhya: Sai's college friend(2021)
 Deepali Pansare as Barkha Rani Wagh: A celebrity Lavani dancer from Sai's village Gadchiroli (2021)
 Kushagre Dua as Amey Gupte: Sarita's husband; Shivani's former boyfriend (2021)
 Minoli Nandwana as Sarita Gupte: Amey's wife (2021)
 Aditya Bansal as Milind: Sai's college friend
 Ami Joshi as Aishwarya: Sai's college friend
 Keshav Ashwani as Sai's college friend
 Yash Abbad as Sai's college friend
 Gajendra Chauhan as Dean of Nagpur City Medical College (2021)
 Sunila Karambelkar as Swapna: Ashwini's elder sister 
 Dolly Minhas as Dr. Anjali: Sai's psychiatrist (2021; 2022)
 Sonia Singh as Anuradha: Rajeev's sister (2022)
 Abhineet Kaushik as Bhau: a goon
 Deepak Soni as Inspector Sachin Kadam 
 Jiten Lalwani as Dr. Machindra Thorat: Sai's senior (2022)
 Siraj Mustafa Khan as Tony: a robber

Guest appearances
Vaishnavi Prajapati as Payal "Chikoo" Joshi to promote Chikoo Ki Mummy Durr Kei (2021)
Celesti Bairagey as Rajjo to promote Rajjo (2022)
Himanshi Parashar as Saheba Kaur Monga to promote Teri Meri Doriyaann (2022-2023)

Production

Controversy 
In July 2022, a lawsuit against the series makers was filed at IBF by some viewers against the ongoing surrogacy track where viewers claimed that Patralekha was shown becoming a surrogate mother through an illegal procedure.

Development 
The filming of the series began in September 2020. Mainly filmed in Mumbai, some initial sequences of the series were shot at Nashik.

In March 2021, the filming was halted for a few days when Neil Bhatt and a crew member tested positive for COVID-19 virus, leading to a change in the track.

On 13 April 2021, Chief Minister of Maharashtra announced a curfew from 15 April. On 16 and 17 April, the team shifted filming to Goa for a few weeks until the government issued a confirmation to resume shooting in Mumbai.

Due to the COVID-19 pandemic, Uddhav Thackeray announced that shooting of all shows must halt within all parts of urban and rural Maharashtra. Hence, Ghum Hai Kisikey Pyaar Meiin producers moved to Goa and were permitted by the government to only shoot indoors, inside their bio-bubble. Everything proceeded as planned, but in May 2021 the producers shot a scene at Goa Fort, violating the regulations.

Filming
A massive fire broke out on the sets of the show located in Goregaon Film City on 10 March 2023. The fire broke out around 4:30 pm.  It was reported that nearly 2000 people were present when the accident took place. Earlier reported to be fire being broke out of cylinder blast later reports claimed that a short circuit happened due to a technical failure in a scheduled fire sequence. No casualties were reported however it was reported that whole set has been burnt down to ashes and the fire even reached the neighboring sets of Ajooni and Teri Meri Doriyaann.

Release 
The first promo of the series was released on 12 September 2020 featuring the leads Ayesha Singh and Neil Bhatt. The promo was released on 1 October 2020 and featured veteran actress Rekha promoting the series. The following promo released before premiere featured Deepika Singh in her character Sandhya Rathi from Diya Aur Baati Hum to promote the series.

On 4 August 2021, Rekha again made an appearance in a teaser to promote the track of Sai and Virat's outdoor trip as well as Samrat's return in the series.

Television special

Ravivaar With Star Parivaar (2022)

The cast of Ghum Hai Kisikey Pyaar Meiin participated as a team in the musical game show Ravivaar With Star Parivaar. It competed with the teams of other Star Plus's shows. Ghum Hai Kisikey Pyaar Meiin emerged as the 4th runner-up of the show.

Soundtrack 

The title song "Ghum Hai Kisikey Pyaar Meiin" is a remake of the song "Ghum Hai Kisi ke Pyar Mein" from the 1972 film Raampur Ka Lakshman, originally composed by R.D. Burman, written by Majrooh Sultanpuri and sung by Lata Mangeshkar and Kishore Kumar. The song was recreated for the series, with the music composed by Dhruv Dhalla.

Awards and nominations

References

External links
 
 Ghum Hai Kisikey Pyaar Meiin on Disney+ Hotstar

2020 Indian television series debuts
Indian drama television series
StarPlus original programming
Hindi-language television shows
Indian television soap operas